Robert F. Stambaugh is an American economist, who specializes in econometrics and finance.

Early life and education 
Stambaugh graduated from the University of Chicago in 1981.

Career 
Stambaugh served as the editor of the Journal of Finance from July 2003 to June 2006 after which he returned to spending most of his time on research and teaching. His research focuses on empirical asset pricing, and he often uses Bayesian analysis in his papers. He was the president of American Finance Association.

He is the Miller Anderson & Sherrerd Professor of Finance at the Wharton School, University of Pennsylvania.

He received the 2021 Fama–DFA Prize for best paper in the Journal of Financial Economics.

External links
Homepage

References 

Living people
Year of birth missing (living people)
American economists
University of Chicago alumni
Wharton School of the University of Pennsylvania faculty
The Journal of Finance editors